Tommy Jan Mörth (born July 16, 1959) is an ice hockey player who played for the Swedish national team. He won a bronze medal at the 1984 Winter Olympics.

Career statistics

Regular season and playoffs

International

References 

1959 births
Living people
Ice hockey players at the 1984 Winter Olympics
Olympic bronze medalists for Sweden
Olympic ice hockey players of Sweden
Swedish ice hockey players
Olympic medalists in ice hockey
Medalists at the 1984 Winter Olympics
Djurgårdens IF Hockey players